Charles Joseph Kersten (May 26, 1902 – October 31, 1972) was a U.S. Representative from Wisconsin.

Born in Chicago, Illinois, Kersten graduated from Marquette University College of Law, Milwaukee, Wisconsin, in 1925 and was admitted to the bar the same year.
He commenced the practice of law in Milwaukee, Wisconsin, in 1928, serving as first assistant district attorney of Milwaukee County from 1937-1943 under District Attorney Herbert Steffes.

Kersten was elected as a Republican to the Eightieth Congress (January 3, 1947 – January 3, 1949) as the representative of Wisconsin's 5th congressional district. He was a close friend of fellow freshman Congressman Richard Nixon.
He was an unsuccessful candidate for reelection in 1948 to the Eighty-first Congress.

Kersten was elected to the Eighty-second and Eighty-third Congresses (January 3, 1951 – January 3, 1955) once again representing Wisconsin's 5th district.
He served as chairman of the United States House Select Committee to Investigate Communist Aggression and the Forced Incorporation of the Baltic States into the U.S.S.R. during the Eighty-third Congress.
He was an unsuccessful candidate for reelection in 1954, and failed in his bid for renomination in 1956, as of 2018 making him the last Republican to represent Milwaukee in the U.S. Congress. In between these campaigns Kersten briefly served in the Eisenhower administration under Nelson Rockefeller as White House consultant on psychological warfare (1955–1956).
He then resumed his law practice, remaining active in anticommunist circles until his death on October 31, 1972, in Milwaukee, Wisconsin.
He was interred in Holy Cross Cemetery.

Sources

External links

 Charles J. Kersten Papers
 
 

1902 births
1972 deaths
Politicians from Chicago
Politicians from Milwaukee
Marquette University Law School alumni
Wisconsin lawyers
Republican Party members of the United States House of Representatives from Wisconsin
20th-century American politicians
Catholics from Illinois
Catholics from Wisconsin
20th-century American lawyers